The 1994–95 Santos Laguna season is the club's 5th consecutive season in the top flight division of Mexican football.

Summary
During the summer the club's owner Grupo Modelo, appointed a new club President Martín Ibarreche replacing Francisco Dávila Rodriguez. The new President sold two fan-favourite players; left-winger Ramón Ramírez and forward Daniel Guzmán, who were both transferred to CD Guadalajara in exchange for midfielder Benjamín Galindo, forward Everaldo Begines and Juan Jose Balcazar. The club added two additional players, Mario Ordiales and Rogelio Romero from CD Toluca, Santos's sister club that is also owned by Grupo Modelo. Argentine midfielder Marcelo Carracedo, after several seasons playing in Germany and Austria, joined the club becoming its fourth foreign player. He arrived just before Santos went on its inaugural pre-season tournament in Colombia.

After a poor first half of the season, Ibarreche appointed a new manager. Miguel Ángel López would replace Pedro García who had led Santos to the 1993–94 Mexican Primera División season final. Zurdo López, who previously managed Club América, arrived with optimism as Santos was second place in Group 4 despite the club's slow start.

Santos was in Group 4 along C.F. Monterrey, Club León and Atlas FC. Each club was experiencing a transitional stage with three new managers (López, León's Roberto Saporiti and Atlas' Marcelo Bielsa), new transfers and the exodus of their best players. Despite the club's strong performances in the previous season, Santos Laguna had an indifferent first half of the season with a defensive record among the worst in the entire league. The squad also struggled offensively with only Colombian striker Miguel Asprilla regularly performing at a high level. It was the midfield and in particular Benjamín Galindo that helped the unbalanced squad finish top of Group 4 and classify directly to the play-off quarterfinals.

Finally, the team was eliminated in the play-offs by CD Guadalajara. After winning the first leg, Santos conceded a late goal (scored by former Santos' player Daniel Guzmán) in the second leg, and lost the tie on away goals.

Squad

Transfers

Competitions

La Liga

League table

Group 1

General table

Results by round

Matches

Quarter-finals

References

External links

1994–95 Mexican Primera División season
1994–95 in Mexican football